José María Jarabo (28 April 1923 – 4 July 1959) was a Spanish spree killer, who between 19 and 21 July 1958, murdered four adults and an unborn baby. Jarabo was sentenced to death by garrote and executed in 1959.

Early life 
José María Manuel Pablo de la Cruz Jarabo Pérez Morris was born on 28 April 1923, in Madrid, Spain. A few years after his birth the family moved to Miami, Florida, in the United States. Jarabo hated the United States and it was there he committed his first crime, trafficking of human beings, for which he was arrested and sentenced to a term of three years in prison. He was confined in a psychiatric hospital in Springfield, Florida, and a few years after his release he returned to Spain, in the 1940s.

In Spain he befriended many wealthy people and began a career as a professional gambler, using the money that his mother sent him from Puerto Rico. According to Jarabo's friends, he was a terrible gambler and spent a lot of money on poker and blackjack. In 1950 he began to drink and take drugs heavily, and as the years went by his financial situation became more dire because his mother stopped sending him money. Jarabo had a British girlfriend named Beryl Martin who wanted to sell a ring, which she gave to Jarabo, who sold it to businessmen Emilio Fernandez and Félix López for a small sum. A few months later Martin asked Jarabo to get the ring back; he decided to kill the two men instead of paying for it.

Murders 
On 19 July 1958 Jarabo went to Emilio Fernandez's house, where a servant woman allowed him to enter after Jarabo stated he was a police inspector. Once inside, Jarabo waited for Fernandez, while the servant went to the kitchen to do some housework. Planning to murder Fernandez and not wanting to leave a witness, Jarabo took a clothes iron and hit the woman across the head. She tried to defend herself, but Jarabo grabbed a kitchen knife and stabbed her to death. After killing the young woman, Jarabo hid and waited for his main target. When Fernandez arrived home, Jarabo shot him in the head, killing him. He then looked for the ring but did not find it. Amparo Alonso entered the house and saw Jarabo, who asked, "Who are you?" Jarabo again claimed that he was a police inspector, but the woman did not believe him and tried to run. Jarabo shot her, killing the pregnant Amparo and her unborn baby. Jarabo slept at Fernandez's house overnight and returned to his hotel the next morning.

On 21 July, Jarabo went to the store where Félix López worked, hid and waited for him. When López arrived at the store Jarabo shot him in the head, killing him.

The next day Jarabo took a bloody suit to the dry cleaners; they promptly notified police, and a few hours later he was arrested. Jarabo was tried and convicted of all five murders, receiving the death sentence for each of them, and was executed by garrote vil on 4 July 1959.

References

1923 births
1959 deaths
Spanish spree killers
Executed spree killers
People executed by ligature strangulation
Executed Spanish people
People executed by Francoist Spain
Spanish murderers of children
Spanish people convicted of murder
People convicted of murder by Spain
People from Madrid
1958 murders in Spain